Pace University Press is a university press affiliated with Pace University in New York City. The presswhich was established in the late 1980s by Pace University professors Sherman Raskin and Mark Husseyis most known for publishing works that analyze the work of Virginia Woolf. Pace University Press also publishes journals that focus on beat poetry, comic books, psychology, and acting, among other topics.

See also

 List of English-language book publishing companies
 List of university presses

References

External links 
Pace University Press

Pace University Press
New York